The 2011 Miami RedHawks football team represented Miami University in the 2011 NCAA Division I FBS football season. The RedHawks were led by first-year head coach Don Treadwell and played their home games at Yager Stadium. They are a member of the East Division of the Mid-American Conference. They finished the season 4–8, 3–5 in MAC play to finish in a tie for fourth place in the East Division.

Schedule

References

Miami
Miami RedHawks football seasons
Miami RedHawks football